was a town located in Nishikanbara District, Niigata Prefecture, Japan. Yoshida is now a part of the expanded city of Tsubame.

As of April 1, 2005, the town had an estimated population of 24,937. The total area was 32.00 km².

On March 20, 2006, Yoshida, along with the town of Bunsui (also from Nishikanbara District), was merged into the expanded city of Tsubame.

Transportation

Railway
  JR East - Echigo Line
  -  -  - 
  JR East - Yahiko Line
 Yoshida

Highway
 
 

Dissolved municipalities of Niigata Prefecture
Tsubame, Niigata